Couldn't Be Hotter is the fourth live album released by The Manhattan Transfer in 2003 on the Telarc label. This is their third live album with Cheryl Bentyne. It was recorded during a tour of Japan over two nights at Orchestra Hall in Tokyo.

Reviews 
"The Transfer's first live recording in seven years. And, yes, after more than two decades in existence, they're still pretty hot."
-- Los Angeles Times

"A great live set by the vocal quartet who specialize in jazz vocalese, still harmonizing strongly with 30-plus years under their belts."
-- Goldmine

"This impressive set shows that the Transfer is still at the peak of their collective powers...it's time we acknowledged them as one of the very best of a dying breed, THE classic vocal group. This CD is proof positive . "Couldn't Be Hotter" indeed."
-- JazzReview.com

"Recorded in Japan, Couldn't Be Hotter fully displays the humor and soaring interplay of Hauser, Siegel, Paul, and Bentyne as they re-establish themselves as the premiere vocal quartet."
-- Rhythm & News

Track listing

Personnel 
The Manhattan Transfer
 Cheryl Bentyne – vocals
 Tim Hauser – vocals
 Alan Paul – vocals
 Janis Siegel – vocals

Musicians
 Yaron Gershovsky – keyboards, arrangements, musical director 
 Wayne Johnson – guitars
 Michael Bowie – bass
 Tom Brechtlein – drums
 Larry Klimas – soprano saxophone, tenor saxophone 
 Lew Soloff – trumpet

Production 
 Tim Hauser – producer 
 Katsu Kusakabe – producer, management director 
 Rick Garcia – production coordinator 
 Kevin Sproatt – engineer 
 Michael Eric Hutchinson – mixing 
 Robert Hadley – mastering 
 Anilda Carrasquillo – art direction, design 
 Robert Hoffman – photography 
 Nicholas Jeen – tour manager

References / Sources
 The Manhattan Transfer Official Website

The Manhattan Transfer albums
2003 live albums